The National Biosafety Management Agency (NBMA) is an agency under the Federal Ministry of Environment in Nigeria. It was instituted by the National Assembly of the Federal Republic of Nigeria and the bill was signed by the President Goodluck Jonathan into law in April, 2015. The agency was established by the National Biosafety Management Agency Act of 2015 amended in 2019 which serves as a regulatory body guiding modern biotechnology activities in Nigeria to ensure the safeguarding of lives and the environment from the adverse effect of biotechnology activities in Nigeria.

Objectives of the Agency 
 Provides and ensures biosecurity protocols guiding biotechnology activities in the country.
 Provision of access to safe, ethical and good use of biotechnological products.
 Ensuring sustenance of acceptance and profitable biotechnology technology to support innovation.
 Promote global competition and export of homemade biotechnology products
 Development of legislations in tandem with international regulations to ensure the safety of biotechnology activities in the country..

Structure of the Agency 
The National Biosafety Management Agency is presently made up of six major departments;
 Administration and Finance
 Planning, Research and Statistics
 Biosecurity
 Environmental Biosafety and General Release Department
 Biosafety Enforcement and Operations Department
 Socio-Economic and Food Safety Department

Achievements of the Agency 
As parts of its mandate to sensitize the public on the safety of biotechnology activities, the agency in recent past visited the law enforcements agencies to carry out sensitization program on the enforcement and regulation of genetically modified products in the country.  The agency also carries out training of personnel that will manage its laboratory to ensure international standards. Also, the agency host its annual conference where it does not fail to enlighten the public and the government on the safety of biotechnology products and also the importance of attaching safety measures while carrying out biotechnological researches. As part of its plan to improve standard practices in biotechnology in Nigeria, the agency has begun the drafting of regulations guiding genome editing in Nigeria.

References 

2015 establishments in Nigeria
Government agencies established in 2015
Government agencies of Nigeria
Environmental agencies